The Terrible Truth About Liberals is a 1998 political book by conservative radio host Neal Boortz.

Overview
Author and libertarian radio talk show host Neal Boortz questions the true definitions of American democracy and gives his insights into current social and political issues, claiming that liberals are the cause of many current problems in the United States.

References

External links
Boortz.com

Books about politics of the United States
1998 non-fiction books
Libertarian books
Neoconservatism
Books critical of modern liberalism in the United States
Political books